Sapromyza (Sapromyzosoma) quadricincta, is a species of small flies of the family Lauxaniidae present in Europe.

References

Lauxaniidae
Lauxanioidea genera
Diptera of Europe
Insects described in 1895
Taxa named by Theodor Becker